Lars Palmqvist (born 28 September 1961) is a Swedish orienteering competitor. He received a silver medal in the relay event at the 1985 World Orienteering Championships in Bendigo, together with Michael Wehlin, Kjell Lauri and Jörgen Mårtensson.

Palmqvist lives with his wife and children in Barkarby, Stockholm.

References

1961 births
Living people
Swedish orienteers
Male orienteers
Foot orienteers
World Orienteering Championships medalists